2384 Schulhof is a mid-sized asteroid and the namesake of the Schulhof family, located in the Eunomian region of the intermediate asteroid belt. It was discovered on 2 March 1943, by French astronomer Marguerite Laugier at Nice Observatory in southeastern France. The asteroid was later named after Hungarian astronomer Lipót Schulhof.

Orbit and classification 

Schulhof is the principal body and namesake of the Schulhof family, a small asteroid family within the region of the Eunomia family of the main-belt. It orbits the Sun in the central asteroid belt at a distance of 2.3–2.9 AU once every 4 years and 3 months (1,541 days). Its orbit has an eccentricity of 0.12 and an inclination of 14° with respect to the ecliptic. The body's observation arc begins with its official discovery observation at Nice in 1943.

Naming 

This minor planet was named in memory of Austrian–Hungarian astronomer Lipót Schulhof (1847–1921), observer of asteroids and comets, discoverer of the main-belt asteroid 147 Protogeneia, and awardee of the Lalande Prize. The official naming citation was published by the Minor Planet Center on 17 February 1984, based on a suggestion by Brian G. Marsden.

Physical characteristics 

Schulhof is an assumed S-type asteroid.

Rotation period 

In April 2002, a rotational lightcurve of Schulhof was obtained from photometric observations at the U.S. Oakley Observatory. It gave a well-defined rotation period of  hours with a brightness variation of 0.43 magnitude.

Diameter and albedo 

According to the survey carried out by the NEOWISE mission of NASA's Wide-field Infrared Survey Explorer, Schulhof measures 11.5 and 11.7 kilometers in diameter and its surface has an albedo of 0.27 and 0.28, respectively. The Collaborative Asteroid Lightcurve Link assumes an albedo of 0.21 – derived form 15 Eunomia, the family's largest member and namesake – and calculates a diameter of 12.7 kilometers with an absolute magnitude of 11.8.

References

External links 
 Lightcurve Database Query (LCDB), at www.minorplanet.info
 Dictionary of Minor Planet Names, Google books
 Asteroids and comets rotation curves, CdR – Geneva Observatory, Raoul Behrend
 Discovery Circumstances: Numbered Minor Planets (1)-(5000) – Minor Planet Center
 
 

002384
Discoveries by Marguerite Laugier
Named minor planets
19430302